Allanson is a surname. Notable people with the surname include:

 Andy Allanson (born 1961), American baseball player
 Ashley Allanson (born 1986), English professional footballer
 Noel Allanson (1925–2022), Australian rules footballer
 Robert Allanson (1735–1846), British architect
 Rowland Allanson-Winn, 5th Baron Headley (1855–1935), Irish peer
 Susie Allanson (born 1952), American country music singer and actress

See also
 Allanson, Western Australia